Lago di Lei is a reservoir in the Valle di Lei, powering the Hinterrhein storage power stations. The reservoir is almost entirely in Italy, but the barrage was built on territory ceded by Italy to Switzerland (municipality of Ferrera, Grisons) in 1955 after diplomatic talks, while an equivalent sized territory further north of the lake was ceded to Italy in the exchange. The dam is operated by Kraftwerke Hinterrhein.
The waters of the lake are the only waters in Italian territory that drain to the North Sea, being part of the Rhine's drainage basin. Other waters of Italy that do not flow to the Mediterranean Sea are found in the valley of Livigno, valley of Sexten, Puster Valley east of Innichen, and most of the waters of the municipality of Tarvisio east of Sella Nevea: all these waters flow to the Black Sea through the basin of the Danube.

See also
List of lakes of Switzerland
List of mountain lakes of Switzerland

References

External links
 Hinterrhein storage power stations
 Kraftwerke Hinterrhein increase efficiency thanks to modern technology, article about renovation of power plant that included drainage of the Lago di Lei reservoir.

 
 KHR: Valle di Lei: Der Rhein entspringt auch in Italien 
 KHR: Valle di Lei: il Reno è anche un po' italiano 

Lei
Lei
Lei
Lei
Lei
Province of Sondrio
Italy–Switzerland border
Lei
Ferrera